Kleaw Thanikhul was a Thai Chao pho (organized crime boss) and a Muay Thai promoter.

Biography
Thanikhul was born on September 13, 1934 in Tambon Don Manora, Amphoe Bang Khonthi, Samut Songkhram Province. Thanikhul had a twin who was stillborn, his mother died giving birth. The name "Kleaw" meaning is literally "avoid (from various dangers)" or "being saved".

At the age of 7 or 8 his father died and Thanikhul was brought up by relatives.

Later, he came to Bangkok to live with his elder sister in Suan Mali neighbourhood where he made a reputation in the outlaw circle. He earned the aliases Laow Suan-Mali (เหลา สวนมะลิ) and Chao pho Nakhon Ban (เจ้าพ่อนครบาล, "god father of metropolitan"), with Chao pho ber nueng (เจ้าพ่อเบอร์หนึ่ง, "No.1 godfather"). He became a Muay Thai promoter and owner the Muay Thai gym "Sor.Thanikhul" (ส.ธนิกุล), there are many famous Muay Thai kickboxers in this stable, such as Dieselnoi Chor Thanasukarn, Inseenoi Sor.Thanikul, Bangkhlanoi Sor.Thanikul, Lomisan Sor.Thanikhul, Sombat Sor.Thanikhul and Boonlai Sor.Thanikul. He was also the president of the Amateur Boxing Association of Thailand, and considered as the most influential figure in Thai boxing cycle in the 1980s.

Thanikhul was photographed on the cover of the magazine Muay Siam (มวยสยาม), the first issue was published in September 1986, a popular Muay Thai magazine in that era.

In the main event of "Suek Onesongchai" match between Chamuekpet Hapalang vs. Langsuan Panyuthaphum on the evening of March 4, 1988 at Lumpinee Stadium before the fifth round began Chaiwat "Ngow Haphalung" Phalungwattanakit, a Muay Thai gambler and Hapalang manager was shot dead by a lone hitman. No one knew for sure who did it but everyone suspected that Klaew Thanikhul was the enforcer.

Murder
Thanikhul survived two attempts on his life, one in 1977 from a grenade thrown outside Rajadamnern Stadium, and another in 1982 from a grenade thrown inside Lumpinee Stadium. He was assassinated on Pinklao-Nakhon Chai Si Road in the area of Amphoe Sam Phran, Nakhon Pathom Province in the early evening of April 5, 1991, aged 56 years, along with an associate. His killers were never caught.

References

External links
 The Rise and Fall Of Muay Thai Godfather Klaew Thanikul (video)

Klaew Thanikhul
Klaew Thanikhul
Klaew Thanikhul
Klaew Thanikhul
Klaew Thanikhul
1934 births
1991 deaths
Klaew Thanikhul